GroundUp is a South African-based not-for-profit news agency.  It publishes most content under a creative commons license and is known for its focus on public interest stories within vulnerable communities with a "bottom-up" style of reporting. Their content is regularly reprinted and featured in other South African news publications such as the Daily Maverick, News24, and Mail & Guardian. The publication was founded in 2012 by Nathan Geffen, a former Treatment Action Campaign member.

Investigations by the publication were notable for exposing corruption within the South African National Lottery scheme. GroundUp editor Geffen and journalist Raymond Joseph were joint winners of the 2021 South African National Editors’ Forum (SANEF) Nat Nakasa award for courageous community journalism.

References 

2012 establishments in South Africa
South African news websites
Publications established in 2012
Mass media in Cape Town
Online newspapers published in South Africa